Aliella is a genus of flowering plants in the daisy family. described as a genus in 1986.

The entire genus is endemic to Morocco.

 Species
 Aliella ballii (Klatt) Greuter - Morocco
 Aliella iminouakensis (Emb.) Dobignard & Jeanm. - Morocco
 Aliella platyphylla (Maire) Qaiser & Lack - Morocco

References

Asteraceae genera
Flora of Morocco